Bucculatrix oppositella is a moth of the family Bucculatricidae. It was described by Otto Staudinger in 1880. It is found in Turkey.

References

Bucculatricidae
Moths described in 1880
Taxa named by Otto Staudinger
Moths of Asia